The sixth season of MTV's reality dating series Are You the One? premiered on September 20, 2017. This was the first season to feature Terrence J as its host, replacing Ryan Devlin.

Cast

Progress 

Notes 
 = Unconfirmed perfect match

Truth Booths

Episodes

After filming 
Joe Torgerson appeared on the first season of Ex on the Beach. Diandra Delgado, Malcolm Drummer and Nurys Mateo appeared on the second season. Geles Rodriguez and Anthony Martin appeared on the third season.

On January 9, 2020, Alexis Eddy died from cardiac arrest in her West Virginia home at the age of 23.

Ethan Cohen appeared on Season 10 of Wild 'N Out, under the pseudonym E-Money.

Uche Nwosu and Clinton Moxam got married on September 4, 2021.

The Challenge

References

Are You the One?
2017 American television seasons